Robert L. Childers is a judge in the Circuit Court of Tennessee for the 30th Judicial District at Memphis.

Career 
Judge Childers was designated by the Tennessee Supreme Court in 2003 to preside over the widely publicized Anna Mae He case.

In a controversial ruling criticised by the Hes and legal experts, Childers terminated the birth parents' parental rights. The ruling was subsequently affirmed by a majority in the Tennessee Court of Appeals, but was completely reversed at the Tennessee Supreme Court.

The case led to a bill called Anna Mae He Act (Bill HB0351), which has passed Tennessee House vote in June 2007. In a separate action in the Tennessee Court of Judiciary, the Hes brought fifteen charges against Childers.

He retired on 20 June 2017.

References

External links
 Judge Childers' Profile
 Childers' ruling on the AMH case
 Anna Mae He case information site
 Tennessee Supreme Court Ruling on the AMH case
 Commercial Appeal Article on Childers' Ruling

Tennessee state court judges
Year of birth missing (living people)
Living people